Jennifer Tremblay (born 1973) is a Canadian writer living in Quebec.

She was born in Forestville. In 1990, she published a collection of poetry Histoires de foudre. She went on to graduate in creative writing at the Université du Québec à Montréal in 1995. In 2004, she published her first novel Tout ce qui brille.

In 2004, she co-founded the publishing house , which publishes books for youth.

Selected works 
 Un secret pour Matisse, youth literature (2004)
 Miro et les canetons du lac vert, youth literature (2006)
 Sacha et son sushi, youth literature (2008)
 Matisse et les vaches lunaires, youth literature (2009)
Her play was translated into five languages.
 Le Carrousel, play (2011)
 La délivrance, play (2014)
 Blues nègre dans une chambre rose, novel (2015)

References 

1973 births
Living people
Canadian women children's writers
Canadian women dramatists and playwrights
Governor General's Award-winning dramatists
Canadian women novelists
Canadian book publishers (people)
Université du Québec à Montréal alumni
Canadian children's writers in French